Gonçalo João Fernandes Loureiro (born 1 February 2000) is a Portuguese professional footballer who plays as a center back for Penafiel.

International career
Loureiro has represented Portugal at youth international level.

Career statistics

Club

Notes

References

2000 births
Living people
Sportspeople from Guimarães
Portuguese footballers
Portugal youth international footballers
Association football defenders
Liga Portugal 2 players
Vitória S.C. players
S.L. Benfica B players
F.C. Penafiel players